A goblin is a small, grotesque, monstrous creature that appears in the folklore of multiple European cultures. First attested in stories from the Middle Ages, they are ascribed conflicting abilities, temperaments, and appearances depending on the story and country of origin, ranging from mischievous household spirits to malicious, bestial thieves.  They often have magical abilities similar to a fairy or demon, such as the ability to shapeshift.

Similar creatures include brownies, dwarves, duendes, gnomes, imps, leprechauns, and kobolds, but it is also commonly used as a blanket term for all small, fay creatures. The term is sometimes expanded to include goblin-like creatures of other cultures, such as the pukwudgie, dokkaebi, or ifrit.

Etymology
Alternative spellings include gobblin, gobeline, gobling, goblyn, goblino, and gobbelin. The term "goblette" has been used to refer to female goblins.

The word goblin is first recorded in the 14th century and is probably from unattested Anglo-Norman *gobelin, similar to Old French gobelin, already attested around 1195 in Ambroise of Normandy's Guerre sainte, and to Medieval Latin gobelinus in Orderic Vitalis before 1141, which was the name of a devil or daemon haunting the country around Évreux, Normandy.
It may be related both to German kobold and to Medieval Latin cabalus - or *gobalus, itself from Greek κόβαλος (kobalos), "rogue", "knave", "imp", "goblin". German Kobold contains the Germanic root kov- (Middle German Kobe "refuge, cavity", "hollow in a rock", Dial. English cove "hollow in a rock", English "sheltered recess on a coast", Old Norse kofi "hut, shed" ) which means originally a "hollow in the earth". The word is probably related to Dial. Norman gobe "hollow in a cliff", with simple suffix -lin or double suffixation -el-in (cf. Norman surnames Beuzelin, Gosselin, Étancelin, etc.)

Alternatively, it may be a diminutive or other derivative of the French proper name Gobel, more often Gobeau, diminutive forms Gobelet, Goblin, Goblot, but their signification is probably "somebody who sells tumblers or beakers or cups". Moreover, these proper names are not from Normandy, where the word gobelin, gobelinus first appears in the old documents.

The Welsh coblyn, a type of knocker, derives from the Old French gobelin via the English goblin.

In folklore

European folklore

 Goblins are common in English, Scottish, and Irish folklore, serving as a blanket term for all sorts of evil or mischievous spirits.
 A redcap is a type of goblin who dyes its hat in human blood in Anglo-Scottish border folklore.
 Hobgoblins are friendly trickster goblins from English, Scottish, and Pilgrim folklore and literature.
 The Erlking is a malevolent goblin from German legend.
 The trasgu is a Northern Spanish and Northern Portuguese mythological creature of Celtic and Roman origin.

Goblin-like creatures in other cultures

 A pukwudgie is a type of goblin from Wamponoag folklore.
 The muki is a pale goblin who lives in caves in the Andes in Quechuan folklore.
 In South Korea, goblins, known as dokkaebi (도깨비), are important creatures in folklore, where they reward good people and punish the evil, playing tricks on them.
 In Bangladesh, Santal people believe in gudrobonga which is very similar to goblins.
 In South African mythology, the tokoloshe (or tikoloshe or tikoloshi) is a dwarf-like creatures similar to a goblin.
 Goblins have at times been conflated with the jinn, specifically ifrit and ghilan, of Islamic culture.

In fiction

Fairy tales and folk stories 

 "The Goblin Pony", from The Grey Fairy Book (French fairy tale)
 "The Benevolent Goblin", from Gesta Romanorum (England)
 "The Goblins at the Bath House" (Estonia), from A Book of Ghosts and Goblins (1969)
 "The Goblins Turned to Stone" (Dutch fairy tale)
 King Gobb (Moldovan Gypsy folktale)
 Goblins are featured in the Danish fairy tales The Elf Mound, The Goblin and the Grocer, and The Goblin and the Woman.
 Goblins are featured in the Norwegian folktale The Christmas Visitors at Kvame.
 Goblins are featured in the Swedish fairy tales The Four big Trolls and little Peter Pastureman and Dag, and Daga and the Flying Troll of Sky Mountain where they live among trolls alongside sprites and gnomes.
 Goblins are featured in the French fairy tale called The Golden Branch.
 Chinese Ghouls and Goblins (England 1928)
 "The Goblin of Adachigahara" (Japanese fairy tale)
 The Boy Who Drew Cats (Japanese fairy tale)
 Twenty-Two Goblins (Indian fairy tale)
 The Korean nursery song 'Mountain Goblin(산도깨비)' tells of meeting a dokkaebi and running away to live.

Modern fiction 

In J. R. R. Tolkien's The Hobbit the evil creatures living in the Misty Mountains are referred to as goblins. In The Lord of the Rings the same creatures are primarily referred to as orcs.

Goblinoids are a category of humanoid legendary creatures related to the goblin. The term was popularized in the Dungeons & Dragons fantasy role-playing game, in which goblins and related creatures are a staple of random encounters. Goblinoids are typically barbaric foes of the various human and "demi-human" races. Even though goblinoids in modern fantasy fiction are derived from J. R. R. Tolkien's orcs, the main types of goblinoids in Dungeons & Dragons are goblins, bugbears and hobgoblins; these creatures are also figures of mythology, next to ordinary goblins.

In the Harry Potter book series and the shared universe in which its film adaptations are set, goblins are depicted as strange, but civilised, humanoids, who often serve as bankers or craftsmen.

In Terry Pratchett's Discworld series, goblins are initially a despised and shunned subterranean race; however, in later books, goblins are eventually integrated with the other races, and their mechanical and engineering talents come to be valued. 

The Green Goblin is a well-known supervillain, one of the archenemies of Spider-Man, who has various abilities including enhanced stamina, durability, agility, reflexes and superhuman strength due to ingesting a substance known as the "Goblin Formula". He has appeared in various Spider-Man related media, such as comics, television series, video games, and films, including Spider-Man (2002) and Spider-Man: No Way Home (2021) as Norman Osborn, and Spider-Man 3 (2007) and The Amazing Spider-Man 2 (2014) as Harry Osborn. 

In the manga and anime Goblin Slayer, goblins are a male only race of average intelligence who abduct female humanoids to procreate and the main antagonists in the series.

In the video game series Elder Scrolls, goblins are a hostile beast race said to originate from Summerset Isle, can range in size from being smaller than a Wood Elf to being larger than a Nord and love living in dank places such as caves and sewers.

In early English translations, The Smurfs were called goblins.

Goblin-related place names
 'The Gap of Goeblin', a hole and tunnel in Mortain, France.
 Hobroyd (which means 'goblin clearing'), High Peak, Derbyshire, UK.
 Goblin Combe, in north Somerset, UK
 Goblin Valley State Park, Utah, US
 Goblin Crescent, Bryndwr, Christchurch, New Zealand
 Yester Castle (also known as "Goblin Hall") East Lothian, Scotland
 Goblin Bay, Beausoleil Island, Ontario, Canada
 Cowcaddens and Cowlairs, Glasgow, Scotland. 'Cow' is an old Scots word for Goblin, while 'cad' means 'nasty'. 'Dens' and 'lairs' refers to goblin homes.
 541132 Leleākūhonua (then known as ) is a minor planet in the outer solar system nicknamed "The Goblin"

See also
 Fairy
 Orc
 Goblin (Dungeons and Dragons)
 Dwarf (folklore)
 Kobold
 Bugbear
 Gnome
 Lutin
 Púca
 Troll
 Goblin mode

References

Cited sources

Further reading

 
 
 
 
 
 
 
 
 
 
 
 
 

 
Fairy tale stock characters